Don Mark Patrick Hederman, OSB, former Abbot of Glenstal Abbey, County Limerick, Ireland, is a Benedictine monk, teacher, lecturer and writer. Formerly headmaster of the school at Glenstal, he was later named academic dean.

Biography

Hederman comes from Ballingarry, the second son in a family of four. Of Glenstal, he said in 2009, "I came here as a boy to school when I was twelve years of age, and apart from about ten years of my life spent in Africa, America and other parts of Europe, I have never lived anywhere else. ... It only existed as a monastery thirty years before I arrived."

Dom Patrick earned a doctorate degree from UCD in the philosophy of education. He has lectured in philosophy and literature outside Ireland, most notably in the United States and Nigeria.

Hederman helped found the cultural journal, The Crane Bag. With Richard Kearney he edited the two-volume collection The Crane bag book of Irish studies. (Dublin : Blackwater/Folens, 1982).

The election as fifth Abbot of Glenstal by the community of Benedictine monks, to an eight-year term, "came as a shock to those who knew him and his work because of the maverick figure that he is in the Irish Church." Also, at 64, Hederman was the oldest to be chosen for the position since the monastery became an Abbey in the 1950s.

In a piece published in early 2011, Abbot Hederman was quoted by novelist and writer Russell Shorto speaking about the sexual-abuse scandals in the Irish Catholic Church.

References

Writings
 Walkabout: Life as Holy Spirit, published by Columba Press (20 May 2005), ;  
 "The Opal and the Pearl", published by Columba Press (September 2016); 9781782183068

External links
 https://openlibrary.org/authors/OL1420453A/Mark_Patrick_Hederman
 http://www.materdei.ie/index.cfm/page/newsarchive/id/66
 http://journalistsueleonard.blogspot.com/2010/12/abbot-of-glenstal-mark-patrick-hederman.html
 

Place of birth missing (living people)
Year of birth missing (living people)
Living people
Benedictine abbots
Irish religious writers
Irish educators
Writers from County Limerick